The Succat Rahamim Synagogue is a Yemenite/Adenite synagogue in Addis Ababa, Ethiopia.

History
The synagogue is located in a neighborhood of Addis Ababa called Banin Sefer. In the early 1900s the Banins, a Jewish family originally from Aden in Yemen, owned much of the land in what is now downtown Addis Ababa. The synagogue dates to the mid-20th century. Between the 1950s and the 1970s, the synagogue bustled with members during the holidays and on Shabbat. Because of the dwindling Jewish community in Addis Ababa, the synagogue has not had a rabbi for decades and there are not enough men to regularly have a minyan.

See also
Adeni Jews
History of the Jews in Ethiopia
List of synagogues in Ethiopia
Yemenite Jews

References

Adeni Jews
Buildings and structures in Addis Ababa
Jews and Judaism in Ethiopia
Synagogues in Ethiopia
Yemeni-Jewish diaspora